In 1987 the National League, also known as British League Division Two, was the second tier of speedway racing in the United Kingdom.

Team changes
Glasgow Tigers were without a home so they joined the 1987 season based at Workington's Derwent Park.

Mid-season withdrawals
On 31 July, Glasgow Tigers (now called Workington Tigers held their last fixture against Stoke. The following day on 1 August, Boston Barracudas withdrew after a heavy home defeat to Eastbourne. Both Glasgow-Workington and Boston had their results expunged.

Summary
The league champions that year were Eastbourne Eagles.

Final table

National League Knockout Cup
The 1987 National League Knockout Cup was the 20th edition of the Knockout Cup for tier two teams. Eastbourne Eagles were the winners of the competition for the third successive year.

First round

a=Abandoned

Second round

a=Abandoned

Quarter-finals

Semi-finals

Final
First leg

Second leg

Eastbourne were declared Knockout Cup Champions, winning on aggregate 100–91.

Leading averages

Riders & final averages
Arena Essex

Andrew Silver 10.66
Martin Goodwin 8.91
Nigel Leaver 6.76
Gary Chessell 6.18
Ian Humphreys 4.55
Steve Bishop 4.06
Mark Chessell 2.98
Lawrie Bloomfield 2.73
Simon Wolstenholme 2.00

Berwick

Charlie McKinna 8.08 
Steve McDermott 8.00
Phil White 7.88
Rob Woffinden 7.68
Rob Grant Sr. 6.93
Ian Stead 6.85
Wayne Ross 6.45
Sean Courtney 6.06 
Paul McHale 4.57

Boston (withdrew from league)

Andy Hines 8.17
Carl Baldwin 6.35
Phil White 5.81
Andy Fisher 4.96
Wally Hill 3.60
Jonathan Cooper 3.32
Gary Clegg 3.29
Jamie Young 3.27
Chris Mulvihill 1.75

Canterbury

Dave Mullett 8.62 
Mike Spink 7.51 
Rob Tilbury 7.15
Paul Whittaker 6.93 
Paul Evitts 6.33
Mark Lyndon 5.63
Richard Pettman 3.95
Carl Chalcraft 3.76
Jimmy Goodsell 2.00

Eastbourne

Martin Dugard 10.40
Gordon Kennett 9.40
Andy Buck 8.66
Dean Standing 7.33 
Keith Pritchard 7.02 
Dean Barker 5.16
Darren Standing 4.30
Steve Chambers 4.00

Edinburgh

Les Collins 9.96 
Doug Wyer 8.40
Brett Saunders 7.77
Dave Trownson 6.90
Chris Cobby 6.15
Scott Lamb 5.55 
Phil Jeffrey 4.73
Jamie Young 2.87
Ray Taaffe 2.82
Colin Smith 1.00
Shaun Bickley 0.71

Exeter

Alan Rivett 7.59
Colin Cook 7.44
David Smart 7.43
Kevin Price 6.81
Michael Coles 5.09
Andy Sell 4.66
Dave Gibbs 4.46
Tony Mattingley 3.77

Glasgow (withdrew from league)

Steve Lawson 8.48
Gordon Whitaker 7.16
Martin McKinna 5.35
Jacko Irving 4.63
Derek Cooper 3.35
Geoff Powell 3.10
Jim Graham 2.59

Long Eaton

Glenn Doyle 8.50 
Nigel Sparshott 7.72
Keith White 7.33
Gerald Short 7.02
Glyn Taylor 6.14
Miles Evans 6.00
Richie Owen 4.78
Ian Stead 4.00
Rob Carter 3.52
Kevin Price 3.31
Mark Ferry 2.30
Mark Hepworth 1.84

Middlesbrough

Martin Dixon 10.01 
Mark Fiora 8.89 
Steve Wilcock 7.56 
Peter McNamara 5.40
Ashley Norton 5.18
Andy Buck 4.97
Mark Burrows 4.38
Geoff Pusey 4.06

Mildenhall

Melvyn Taylor 10.38
Dave Jessup 9.92 
Eric Monaghan 7.90
Dave Jackson 6.42
Richard Green 5.91
Glen Baxter 5.28
Lee Farthing 4.08
Rob Parish 3.40

Milton Keynes

Kevin Smart 8.51 
Trevor Banks 8.48
Keith White 8.19
Andy Hines 7.27
Mark Carlson 6.96
Troy Butler 6.83
Peter Lloyd 6.46
Ian Clark 5.09

Newcastle

David Blackburn 8.90
Tom Owen 7.31
Dave Morton 7.22
Mark Courtney 7.18
Gary O'Hare 5.42
Shane Bowes 4.69
Bernie Collier 4.67
Paul Cooper 1.69

Peterborough

Ian Barney 9.16
Kevin Hawkins 8.69 
Nigel Flatman 7.63 
Carl Baldwin 7.35
Craig Hodgson 6.23
Jamie Habbin 6.17
Pete Chapman 6.09
Rob Fortune 5.08

Poole

Steve Schofield 9.54 
David Biles 9.16 
Martin Yeates 7.66
Kevin Smith 7.33
Wayne Barrett 4.08
Peter Read 3.53
Will James 3.39
Nigel Newman 2.90

Rye House

Paul Woods 8.11 
Barry Thomas 6.93 
Jamie Luckhurst 6.40
Kevin Brice 5.10
Linden Warner 4.99
Kevin Teager 4.81
Gary Rolls 4.44
Rob Parish 4.15
Steve Bryenton 4.00
Julian Parr 3.51

Stoke

Nigel Crabtree 10.20 
Darren Sumner 8.03
Graham Jones 7.94
Paul Stead 7.38
Mike Wilding 6.34
Derek Richardson 5.16
Bobby Duncan 3.71

Wimbledon

Kevin Jolly 9.48
Roger Johns 9.02
Neville Tatum 8.56
Jeremy Luckhurst 6.06
Alan Farmer 5.27
Terry Mussett 5.00
Nathan Simpson 4.36
Mark Fordham 3.79
Mark Lyndon 3.46

See also
List of United Kingdom Speedway League Champions
Knockout Cup (speedway)

References

Speedway British League Division Two / National League